Adrian Bucur (born ) is a Romanian male artistic gymnast, representing his nation at international competitions. He participated at the 2008 Summer Olympics in Beijing, China.
He also competed in the 2009 World Gymnastics Championships.

References

1985 births
Living people
Romanian male artistic gymnasts
Place of birth missing (living people)
Gymnasts at the 2008 Summer Olympics
Olympic gymnasts of Romania